was a Japanese volleyball player born  in Fukuoka, Japan. He was a member of the Japanese Men's National Volleyball Team in the 1960s and early 1970s. He won a total number of three Olympic medals during his career.

References
sports-reference

1941 births
2000 deaths
Japanese men's volleyball players
Japanese volleyball coaches
Olympic volleyball players of Japan
Olympic gold medalists for Japan
Olympic silver medalists for Japan
Olympic bronze medalists for Japan
Volleyball players at the 1964 Summer Olympics
Volleyball players at the 1968 Summer Olympics
Volleyball players at the 1972 Summer Olympics
Sportspeople from Fukuoka (city)
Olympic medalists in volleyball
Asian Games medalists in volleyball
Volleyball players at the 1962 Asian Games
Volleyball players at the 1966 Asian Games
Medalists at the 1962 Asian Games
Medalists at the 1966 Asian Games
Asian Games gold medalists for Japan
Medalists at the 1972 Summer Olympics
Medalists at the 1968 Summer Olympics
Medalists at the 1964 Summer Olympics
20th-century Japanese people